Parker's tree toad (Laurentophryne parkeri) is a species of toad in the family Bufonidae. It is the single species in the genus Laurentophryne, and is endemic to Kivu region in the Democratic Republic of the Congo. Its natural habitat is subtropical or tropical moist montane forests.
It is threatened by habitat loss. To describe their features, they have a straight head and pointed snout that goes further than its mouth. They have dorsal skin granular with multiple warts around their body more or less arranged in rows starting from the snout and moves to the shoulders and beyond; warts depicting a clear X on their backs typically colored grey or grey-whiteish.

Diagnosis: 
"An African bufonid related to Nectophryne but differing in absence of lamelliform subdigital pads and in possession of a palatine bone; differing from Wolterstorffina, Bufo and Nectophrynoides in possessing only seven presacral vertebrae and in having the palatine reduced in extent, and from the last two genera also in the fusion of the sacrum and coccyx" (Tihen, 1960).

References

 
Channing, A., and Rödel Mark-Oliver. Field Guide to the Frogs & Other Amphibians of Africa. Struik Nature, 2019.
 Tihen, J. A. 1960. Two new genera of African bufonids, with remarks on the phylogeny of related genera. Copeia 1960: 225–233.

Laurentophryne
Endemic fauna of the Democratic Republic of the Congo
Taxonomy articles created by Polbot
Amphibians described in 1950